The  is a commuter rail line operated by the third-sector Hokusō Railway (controlled by the Keisei Electric Railway) in Japan. It runs between Keisei-Takasago Station in Katsushika, Tokyo and Inba-Nihon-Idai Station in Inzai, Chiba. It is part of the primary Keisei route between central Tokyo and Narita International Airport through the Narita Sky Access Line. It uses the ATS Type 1 system.

Operations 
Most trains are all-station "Local" services, but some limited-stop "Rapid" express trains have operated in morning and evening hours.
  (L)
 Stops at all stations, all day. Through to Keisei Main Line, Keisei Oshiage Line, Toei Asakusa Line, Keikyū Main Line, Keikyū Airport Line and Keikyū Kurihama Line.
  (Ex)
 Runs only in the evening on weekdays, down from Keisei line.
  (LE)
 Runs only on weekdays.
  (EL)
 Runs on weekdays morning only. This service is bound to Ueno Station.
Fare（adult/500 yen, child/250 yen）
Stop at five stations (Passengers are able to get on at Inba-Nihon-Idai Station, Chiba New Town Chuo Station →  Passengers are able to get off at Aoto Station, Nippori Station, Keisei Ueno Station)
This service has been commenced operating since October 1, 2020.

Stations

Rolling stock

Hokuso Railway
 Hokuso 7300 series (since 1991)
 Hokuso 7500 series (since 2006)

Chiba New Town Railway
 Chiba New Town Railway 9100 series (since 1994, branded "C-Flyer")
 Chiba New Town Railway 9200 series (since March 2013)
 Chiba New Town Railway 9800 series (since 21 March 2017)

Keisei Electric Railway
 Keisei 3000 series (since 2003)
 Keisei 3050 series (since 2010)
Keisei 3100 series (since 2019)
 Keisei 3400 series (since 1993)
 Keisei 3500 series (refurbished sets only)
 Keisei 3700 series (since 1991)
 Keisei AE series (since 2010)

Keikyu
 Keikyu 600 series (since 1994)
 Keikyu N1000 series (since 2002)
 Keikyu 1500 series (since 1985)

Toei Subway
 Toei 5300 series (since 1991, through service with Toei Asakusa Line)
 Toei 5500 series (since 2018, through service with Toei Asakusa Line)

Former rolling stock

Chiba New Town Railway
 Chiba New Town Railway 9000 series (from 1984 until 20 March 2017)

Hokuso Railway
 7000 series (from 1979 until 2007)
 7050 series (rebadged Keisei 3150 series cars leased from Keisei)
 7150 series (from 1991 until 1998, converted from former Keikyu 1000 series EMUs)
 7250 series (from 2003 until 2006, converted from former Keisei 3150 series EMUs)
 Hokuso 7260 series (from 2006 until March 2015, converted from Keisei 3300 series EMUs)

Shin-Keisei Electric Railway
 800 series (also leased to Hokuso Railway)
 8800 series 
 8900 series
 Keisei 200 series

Keisei Electric Railway
 3050 series (original) (until 1995)
 3100 series (until 1998)
 3150 series
 3200 series (until 2007)
 3300 series (unrefurbished sets)
 3500 series (unrefurbished sets)
 3600 series

Toei Subway
 5000 series
 5200 series

Keikyu
 Keikyu 1000 series (until 2010)

History

The first section of the line, from Komuro to Shin-Kamagaya, opened in March 1979, including a temporary connection to the Shin-Keisei Line at Kita-Hatsutomi. As other tracks were connected, it changed its name to "Hokusō Kōdan Line" in April 1987.

Western section
This section was planned as a railway access to Chiba New Town. Initially proposed by a committee of the then Ministry of Transport, the route was numbered "Line 1", as the northern extension of Tokyo Metropolitan Bureau of Transportation (Toei) Line 1 (present Asakusa Line) to Komuro area of Chiba New Town. The through-operation via Shin-Keisei Line to  began, on a temporary basis until the second phase of this section could connect the town directly to the Keisei and Asakusa Line network.

In the following year, Shin-Keisei included Shin-Kamagaya Station as a transfer station, and abandoned the temporary route.

Eastern section
The section east of Komuro was initially the eastern part of a once-planned  (II, apart from the first which opened the Tōbu Noda Line and the Kururi Line) as an extension of Line 10 (Shinjuku Line). The line was to be built from  via  to parallel to the line above, then to terminate at present .

 March 9, 1979: Hokusō Line (first phase) of   – .
 April 1, 1987: On the section of Komuro – Chiba New Town Chūō, Hokusō Development Railway became the Category-2 Railway Business operator, while HUDC became Category-3 Railway Business. Simultaneously, the entire stretch was renamed to 
 March 31, 1991: Hokusō Line (phase 2)  – . Through-operations by four parties (Hokusō, Keisei Electric Railway, Tokyo Metropolitan Bureau of Transportation (Toei), Keihin Electric Express Railway (Keikyū)) began.
 July 4, 1992: Shin-Keisei opened Shin-Kamagaya Station. Through-operation to Shin-Keisei terminated. The section of Kita-Hatsutomi – Shin-Kamagaya was abandoned.
 April 1, 1995: Chiba New Town Chūō – Inzai-Makinohara, as Hokusō Cat-2, HUDC Cat-3
 July 22, 2000: Inzai-Makinohara – Inba-Nihon-Idai, as Hokusō Cat-2, HDC Cat-3. Present stretch completed.

Extension to Narita Airport 
After the abandonment of the planned Narita Shinkansen, routes of rapid transit to Narita Airport had long been discussed. A much faster line had long been needed, and for that purpose the first priority was the Keisei – Hokusō route. The line opened in July 2010.

Local subsidies 
Hokuso Railway fares are significantly higher than those of other private railways in the region. Equivalent journeys on the Keisei Main Line cost 250 yen and 360 yen respectively while equivalent journeys on JR East cost 210 yen and 380 yen respectively. The difference in fares is largely due to the debt burden remaining from the portion of the line built and owned by Hokuso Railway itself; this is also the case for the Tōyō Rapid Railway Line and the Saitama Rapid Railway Line, which are also known for having comparatively high fares.

In 2009, Chiba Prefecture and several municipalities along the line agreed with Hokuso Railway for an average fare reduction of 4.6% (25% for student commuter passes), in exchange for which they agreed to subsidize half of the estimated revenue loss of 600 million yen. The fare reduction was implemented in July 2010 at the time of the opening of the Narita Sky Access Line. In 2011 and 2012, the cities of Shiroi and Inzai elected new mayors on platforms of negotiating for further fare reductions and stopping public subsidies respectively; a third-party study commissioned by the two city governments concluded in August 2013 that the Hokusō Line would break at even more discounted fare levels without local subsidies. Hokuso, on the other hand, has argued that increased consumption tax rates and capital expenditures related to upgrading the Pasmo system will force them to raise fares in 2015. Additional fare reduction measures were implemented on 1 October 2022 which brought down regular fares by around 10% along with commuter passes being discounted by an additional 65%.

References

External links 
  

 
Railway lines in Japan
Railway lines in Tokyo
Railway lines in Chiba Prefecture
Railway lines opened in 1979
Standard gauge railways in Japan
Railway lines in highway medians
Japanese third-sector railway lines